The Messenger Boy is a musical comedy in two acts by James T. Tanner and Alfred Murray, lyrics by Adrian Ross and Percy Greenbank, with music by Ivan Caryll and Lionel Monckton, with additional numbers by Paul Rubens.  The story concerned a rascally financier who tries to discredit a rival in love.  After a tryout in Plymouth, it opened at the Gaiety Theatre in London, managed by George Edwardes, on 3 February 1900 and ran for a very successful 429 performances. Harry Grattan and Edmund Payne starred. Marie Studholme later joined the cast.  It had a Broadway run of 128 performances, at Daly's Theatre, from 16 September 1901 to 4 January 1902. The director was Herbert Gresham, and the musical director was Louis F. Gottschalk.  The cast included Georgia Caine as Nora, Jobyna Howland as Lord Punchestown, May Robson as Mrs. Bang and Flora Zabelle as Isabel Blyth.

Rosie Boote, who played Isabel in the London cast, so charmed Geoffrey Taylour, 4th Marquess of Headfort, that he married her in 1901. She outlived her husband, dying in 1958.  The young ladies appearing in George Edwardes's shows became so popular that wealthy gentlemen, termed "Stage Door Johnnies", would wait outside the stage door hoping to escort them to dinner.  In some cases, as here, a marriage resulted.

Roles and original cast
Hooker Pasha (Commissioner of the Nile) – Harry Nicholls
Cosmos Bey (Agent to Hooker Pasha) – E. J. Lonnen  
Clive Radnor (a Queen's Messenger) – L. Mackinder  
Captain Pott (of the "S.S. Shark") – Fred. Wright, Jun. 
Professor Phunckwitz (a German Egyptologist) – Willie Warde  
Comte Le Fleury – Robert Nainby  
Mr. Tudor Pyke (a Financier) – John Tresahar  
Lord Punchestown (Governor of El Barra) – William Wyes  
Captain Naylor (of the P. and O. "S.S. Sirdar") – Harry Grattan  
Mr. Gascoigne (an Amateur Journalist) – A. Hatherton  
Purser – J. Thompson  
Mr. Trotter – F. Standen  
Tommy Bang (a District Messenger) – Edmund Payne 
Nora (Lady Punchestown's Step-Daughter) – Violet Lloyd (later replaced by Marie Studholme)
Daisy Dapple (a Lady Journalist) – Grace Palotta
Mrs. Bang (Tommy's Mother) – Connie Ediss  
Lady Punchestown (a Leader of London Society) – Maud Hobson
Isabel Blyth – Rosie Boote
Lady Winifred – Margaret Fraser  
Cecilia Gower – Maie Saqui
Rosa (Lady Punchestown's Maid) – Katie Seymour  
Source: Gilbert and Sullivan Archive

Musical numbers

Act I -  Scene 1 -   Hôtel de Luxe, Thames Embankment 
No. 1 - Chorus - "To our Charity Bazaar, Come buy! buy! buy!" 
No. 2 - Cosmos & Chorus - "If there's anybody pining for a reputation shining" 
No. 3 - Lady Punchestown & Pyke - "Supposing a sweet little maid, well-bred, rather clever and fair" 
No. 4 - Nora & Chorus - "Oh, I'm very much afraid there's a lot of scandal made" 
No. 5 - Nora & Clive - "Oh, my dearest, ere I go, there's one thing I want to know" 
No. 6 - Cosmos, Daisy, Gascoigne, Le Fleury, & Phunckwitz - "If you want to go by a proper P. & O." 
No. 7 - Tommy & Chorus - "I am a smart little sort of a chap, very obliging and active" 
No. 8 - Rosa & Tommy - "I'm a little messenger, summon'd by a call"

Act I -  Scene 2 -   Brindisi
No. 9 - Chorus - "Tarentella" - "Tra la la la la la la la" 
No. 10 - Clive & Chorus - "I met a Miss Mary Maclean on the boat, alone and in charge of the skipper" 
No. 11 - Captain Naylor, Captain Pott, & Cosmos - "I will bet the crowd a dinner that I get to Egypt first!" 
No. 12 - Mrs. Bang & Chorus - "You talk about detectives in a story, that guess whatever people say or do" 
No. 13 - Concerted Piece - "Oh, Captain, we're sure you can tell us a lot, we want your advice if you please" 
No. 14 - Finale Act I - "Cast the moorings free, warp the vessels round"

Act II -  Scene 1 - Cairo; Scene 2 - Up the Nile; Scene 3 - El Barra
No. 15 - Chorus - "Sheltered from the noon-day glare, civilized society gazes on the passers by" 
No. 16 - Hooker Pasha & Chorus - "My name it is Hooker Pasha, no family tree can I muster" 
No. 17 - Clive, Daisy, Gascoigne, Phunckwitz & Le Fleury - "Now this trip you should take" 
No. 18 - Isabel & Chorus - "There's a girl you may have met, if you have you won't forget; she is Maisie" 
No. 19 - Dervish Dance 
No. 20 - Song and Dance - Rosa - "Oh, when de moon am rising" 
No. 21 - Lady Punchestown, Pyke, Mrs. Bang, & Hooker - "Now how shall we try to stop this lad?" 
No. 22 - Captain Pott & Chorus - "I'm famous Captain Pott" 
No. 23 - Chorus - "Let the trumpets and the drums, as they blare and roll and rattle, greet the Governor that comes" 
No. 24 - Rosa & Tommy - "Oh, if you please, I'm Rameses" 
No. 25 - Nora & Chorus - "The boys go marching down the street, with a tramp, tramp, tramp" 
No. 26 - Mrs. Bang & Chorus - "Although I'm British born, I do not look with scorn on foreigners as such" 
No. 27 - Finale Act II, with Nora & Clive - "We will take our wedding trip upon the Nile"

References

External links

Vocal score
Song list and links to Midi files, lyrics and original cast list
Information about the Broadway production

Messenger Boy, The
West End musicals
Original musicals
British musicals